Cadlina rumia is a species of sea slug or dorid nudibranch, a marine gastropod mollusk in the family Cadlinidae.

Distribution
Distribution of Cadlina rumia is amphiatlantic (occurring in Western Atlantic and in Eastern Atlantic). Distribution in Western Atlantic includes: Florida, Belize, Panama, Venezuela, Bahamas, Dominican Republic, Jamaica, Puerto Rico, Curaçao, St. Maarten/St. Martin, St. Lucia, St. Vincent & the Grenadines, Grenada, Brazil and Panama. This is the only species of Cadlina in the tropical western Atlantic. Distribution in Eastern Atlantic includes: ...

Description
Body is oval and flat, covered with numerous small tubercles. Background color is usually translucent white with a few yellow spots (mantle glands). Rhinophores and gill are often yellowish brown. It is up to 15 mm long.

Ecology
Minimum and maximum recorded depth is 0 m. Cadlina rumia was found under rocks and on various sponges. This species feeds on several types of sponges from different orders (including spiculate and non-spiculate species), exhibiting a not specialized diet preference among the spongivorous dorid nudibranchs. Prey of Cadlina rumia include sponges Dysidea etheria, Haliclona sp., Callyspongia sp. and Scopalina sp.

References
This article incorporates Creative Commons (CC-BY-4.0) text from the reference

External links

Cadlinidae
Gastropods described in 1955
Taxa named by Ernst Marcus (zoologist)